Doug Craig may refer to:

 Doug Craig, mayor of Cambridge, Ontario, Canada
 Douglas Craig, former chairman of York City Football Club